A quarter stick is a large firecracker that falls within a certain range of dimensions. No true standard for dimensions and construction exists, as these devices are products of bootleg manufacturers.

The term quarter stick is based on a quarter-stick of dynamite, which it somewhat resembles. However, quarter stick firecrackers do not contain nitroglycerin as dynamite does, and have far less explosive power.

In the United States, quarter sticks and similar large firecrackers are illegal to manufacture or possess without an ATF High Explosives Manufacturing License.

They are sometimes colloquially known as M-1000s or "Block Busters". The smaller M100 is also known as "Silver Salutes." The M250 is also known as "Pineapples."

See also 
 M-80 (explosive)
 Salute (pyrotechnics)

References 
ATF Fact Sheet - Illegal Explosives Devices

Types of fireworks